Standing Ovation at Newport is a live album by American jazz flautist Herbie Mann recorded at the Newport Jazz Festival in 1965 (with one track from an earlier performance at The Village Gate)  for the Atlantic label.

Reception

AllMusic awarded the album 4 stars with its review by Scott Yanow noting "The performance by Herbie Mann's group was one of the high points of the 1965 Newport Jazz Festival".

Track listing
 "Patato" (Dave Pike) - 8:21
 "Stolen Moments" (Oliver Nelson) - 9:35
 "Mushi Mushi" (Herbie Mann) - 6:02
 "Comin' Home Baby" (Ben Tucker, Bob Dorough) - 10:51

Personnel 
Herbie Mann - flute
John Hitchcock, Mark Weinstein - trombone
Dave Pike - vibraphone
Chick Corea - piano 
Earl May (tracks 1-3), Ben Tucker (track 4) - bass
Bruno Carr - drums
Carlos "Patato" Valdes - congas

References 

1965 live albums
Herbie Mann live albums
Atlantic Records live albums
Albums recorded at the Newport Jazz Festival
Albums recorded at the Village Gate